NDD may refer to:
non-DAC donor, that is, a donor outside the Development Assistance Committee (DAC)
National Direct Dialing, local area code of a phone number
Nature deficit disorder
Network for Democracy and Development
Sumbe Airport
Node Deployment Device
 Neurodevelopmental delay 
 Neurodevelopmental disorder 
 Neurological determination of death